Monny de Boully (1904 in Belgrade - 1968 in Paris in a taxi) was a Franco-Serbian writer and poet.

Surrealist poet 
Born into a family of Serbian Sephardic bankers, as Solomon Buli, de Boully was educated in Belgrade. He participated in the research of the Yugoslav avant-gardes.

He arrived in Paris in 1925, where he met André Breton, Louis Aragon and Benjamin Péret. He published one text in the publication La Révolution surréaliste. In 1928, he created with Arthur Adamov and  the magazine  which will have only one issue and participated in issues two and three of the  magazine.

Paulette Grobermann (1903-1995), wife of Armand Lanzmann (both parents of Claude Lanzmann and Jacques Lanzmann), left her husband for the love of Monny de Boully.

In 1943,  saved Monny de Boully and his wife Paulette, arrested by the Gestapo.

 Work 
1991: Au-delà de la mémoire,  EST-Samuel Tastet Éditeur

 References 

 External links 
 À toi, Paulette, à toi seule, éternellement Claude Lanzman on La règle du jeu''
 SALMON MONNY DE BOULLY on Avandgarde museum
 Salmon Monny de Boully on nadrealizam

20th-century French poets
Writers from Belgrade
1904 births
1968 deaths
Yugoslav emigrants to France
Serbian Sephardi Jews